Nordic Regional was an airline based in Umeå, Sweden. It operated a scheduled network of services linking one international and five domestic destinations. Its main base was Stockholm-Arlanda Airport.

All operations were cancelled in 2008.

Destinations 
Nordic Airways served the following Swedish airports in 2008: Gällivare Airport, Kramfors Airport, Luleå Airport, Åre Östersund Airport, Stockholm-Arlanda Airport, and Umeå Airport.

Fleet 
The Nordic Regional fleet included the following aircraft (as of 8 September 2008)

1 Saab 340A

As of 8 September 2008, the average age of the Nordic Regional fleet was 22.8 years.

References

External links 
Nordic Regional
Nordic Regional fleet

Defunct airlines of Sweden
Airlines disestablished in 2008